Events from the year 1238 in Ireland.

Incumbent
Lord: Henry III

Events
Robert Luttrell was appointed Lord Chancellor of Ireland

Births

Deaths

References

 
1230s in Ireland
Ireland
Years of the 13th century in Ireland